Ricardo Puno may refer to one of the following:
 Ricardo Concepción Puno (1923–2018), Philippine jurist;
 Ricardo Villanueva Puno Jr. (born 1946), Philippine journalist.